Anthony Lavon Wright (born February 14, 1976) is a former American football quarterback in the National Football League for the Pittsburgh Steelers, Dallas Cowboys, Baltimore Ravens, Cincinnati Bengals and New York Giants. He played college football at the University of South Carolina.

Early years
Wright attended West Craven High School, where he played as a quarterback. As a senior, he was named All-state, SuperPrep All-American and Gatorade Player-of-the-Year. He finished his high school career with 4,890 passing yards, 44 touchdowns and 15 interceptions.

College career
Wright accepted a football scholarship from the University of South Carolina. As a redshirt freshman, he was a backup behind Steve Taneyhill, making 17 out of 27 completions for 207 yards, 2 touchdowns and one interception. As a sophomore, he became a starter after Taneyhill graduated, posting 1,850 passing yards, 8 passing touchdowns, 3 interceptions, 90 rushing yards and 3 rushing touchdowns.

As a junior, he suffered a torn anterior cruciate ligament in his right knee against the University of Tennessee, missing the final two games of the season. He had 1,685 passing yards, a school record 18 passing touchdowns, 5 interceptions, 44 rushing yards and one rushing touchdown.

As a senior, head coach Brad Scott platooned him with freshman Phil Petty, but still recorded 1,899 passing yards, 10 passing touchdowns, 10 interceptions, 56 rushing yards and 3 rushing touchdowns. He left as the school's fifth all-time passer, leading the school to a 12-21 record over the three years he was the starter, including one winning campaign and a 1-10 record in his last season.

College statistics

Professional career

Pittsburgh Steelers
Wright was signed as an undrafted free agent by the Pittsburgh Steelers after the 1999 NFL Draft. He made such a good impression in preseason that the team made the unusual move keeping him as the fourth-string quarterback, behind Kordell Stewart, Mike Tomczak, and Pete Gonzalez. On August 27, 2000, he was waived after being passed on the depth chart by rookie Tee Martin.

Dallas Cowboys
On August 30, 2000, Wright was signed by the Dallas Cowboys to their practice squad. Even though he hadn't played in an NFL regular season game, he was scouted in a preseason game between the Cowboys and the Steelers.

In November, he was promoted to the active roster after backup quarterback Randall Cunningham was injured. On December 10, when Troy Aikman suffered a concussion playing against the Washington Redskins, Wright played the remaining three quarters in a 32–13 win. Although he had attempted only 5 passes (3 completions) in the previous game, he was given the start in the next game against the New York Giants, which resulted in a 17–13 loss. He would also start the final game of the season against the Tennessee Titans, which resulted in a 31-0 loss after he had three critical turnovers in the third quarter.

In 2001, he became the backup quarterback after Tony Banks was cut. When starter Quincy Carter injured his throwing thumb, Wright became his replacement and started on September 23 against the San Diego Chargers, but had two costly turnovers in a 21-32 loss. The next week he started in an 18-40 loss against the Philadelphia Eagles, in which he was ineffective. On October 7, he replaced an injured Carter but the team still lost 21-28 against the Oakland Raiders. The next week he started on Monday Night Football and contributed to a 9-7 win against Tony Banks and the Washington Redskins. Having a chronic right knee injury, he decided to have his knee scoped to repair the cartilage damage, forcing him to sit the rest of the season. The Cowboys would use a combination of Clint Stoerner and Ryan Leaf as the starters until Carter recovered from a torn hamstring, starting a franchise-high four quarterbacks in a season.

Head coach Dave Campo released Wright from the team on September 1, 2002, following the acquisition of quarterback Chad Hutchinson during the offseason, while stating that Stoerner was better suited for the third-string quarterback role, in light of Wright's ambition to be a starter.

Baltimore Ravens
Wright was signed by the Baltimore Ravens to their practice squad in 2002. After first round draft choice Kyle Boller injured his thigh in a game against the St. Louis Rams, Wright was activated from the practice squad on October 15.

After the Ravens lost to the Miami Dolphins in his first start 6-9, Wright led a spectacular comeback against the Seahawks; with the score tied at three in the final minute of the first half, the Seahawks scored two quick touchdowns, and stormed to a 41-24 lead with seven minutes remaining, but Wright erupted with four touchdown throws and 319 passing yards in a 44-41 overtime triumph. Ravens head coach Brian Billick gave the game ball to Wright's wife, for waiting until after the contest to induce labor.

The Ravens won five of their last six games with Wright posting a 5-2 record and having a critical role in the team reaching the playoffs, where they lost a close game against the Tennessee Titans with a score of 20-17, with the difference being a 46-yard field goal with 29 seconds left. He finished the season with 1,199 passing yards, 9 touchdowns and 8 interceptions.

Wright missed the 2004 season after having surgery to repair a torn labrum in his right shoulder. Following another injury to Boller during the first game of the 2005 season, he was named the starting quarterback, but was again demoted after having a 2-5 record.

Cincinnati Bengals
With the departure of Carson Palmer's former backup quarterback Jon Kitna to the Detroit Lions, Wright signed a one-year deal with the Cincinnati Bengals on April 21, 2006, winning a competition with Craig Krenzel and Doug Johnson for the backup job.

New York Giants
On April 13, 2007, he signed as a free agent with the New York Giants, throwing him into a four-quarterback scramble for roster spots with Eli Manning, Tim Hasselbeck, and Jared Lorenzen. He was named the third-string quarterback in a season that saw the team win Super Bowl XLII, beating the previously undefeated New England Patriots.

On August 18, 2008, Wright suffered a back injury in a preseason game against the Cleveland Browns and was eventually placed on the injured reserve list on August 30. He wasn't re-signed the next season and decided to announce his retirement.

NFL career statistics

Personal life
Wright has had two cousins play in the NFL, Jesse Campbell who played safety from 1991–1998, and Justin Hardy who played wide receiver from 2015–2021.

Wright was shot multiple times after an argument on July 1, 2019, in Concord, North Carolina. He underwent emergency surgery to treat his injuries.

References

External links
 

1976 births
Living people
People from Craven County, North Carolina
Players of American football from North Carolina
American football quarterbacks
American shooting survivors
South Carolina Gamecocks football players
Pittsburgh Steelers players
Baltimore Ravens players
Cincinnati Bengals players
Dallas Cowboys players
New York Giants players